LeVar Burton Reads is a podcast hosted by LeVar Burton, where he reads a piece of short fiction and shares his thoughts on it.

Reception 
LeVar Burton Reads has been well received by both USA Today and The New Yorker.

The podcast won the 2020 Ignyte Award for Best Fiction Podcast.

References

External links 
 
 You Can Get LeVar Burton to Read Your Work on his Podcast
 LeVar Burton Is Still Reading To Us During The Pandemic
 'LeVar Burton Reads' joins Twitter livestream
 LeVar Burton wants to read you his favorite short stories
 LeVar Burton Reading a Neil Gaiman Short Story is Even Better Than ‘American Gods’ — Listen
 LeVar Burton still loves reading aloud. His storytelling might be what you need right now.
 Levar Burton's New Podcast is Like Reading Rainbow for Adults
 'Reading Rainbow' Owner Accuses LeVar Burton of "Theft and Extortion" in Lawsuit
 Hooray, LeVar Burton Is Now Legally Allowed to Use His Reading Rainbow Catchphrase
 LeVar Burton Would Like to Read You a Story
 Seven of the Best Episodes of Levar Burton Reads
 Review: 'LeVar Burton Reads' Is 'Reading Rainbow' For Grown-Ups
 Under the Radar: LeVar Burton Reads

2017 podcast debuts
American podcasts
Audio podcasts
Speculative fiction podcasts
Works based on short fiction